Ole Johan Singsdal (born 8 May 1979) is a Norwegian football (soccer) attacking midfielder, who plays for KIL/Hemne, the club where he started his career.

In 1998, he moved to Rosenborg BK, where he was mainly a backup player, making just 2 appearances in 3 years and in 2000 was loaned out to Byåsen IL. The move was made permanent a year later and Singsdal spent 2 seasons with the club and in 2003 joined the club where he plays now, KIL/Hemne.

References / external links
Rosenborg Web - Former player: Ole Johan Singsdal
VG Nett - Ole Johan Singsdal
KIL/Hemne Fotball - Ole Johan Singsdal

1979 births
Living people
People from Hemne
Norwegian footballers
Association football midfielders
Rosenborg BK players
Byåsen Toppfotball players
Eliteserien players
Sportspeople from Trøndelag